Choeromorpha mystica is a species of beetle in the family Cerambycidae. It was described by Francis Polkinghorne Pascoe in 1869, originally under the genus Agelasta. It is known from the Philippines.

References

Choeromorpha
Beetles described in 1869